Slobodan Kićović (19 July 1941 – 16 March 2020) was a Yugoslav swimmer. He competed in two events at the 1960 Summer Olympics.

References

1941 births
2020 deaths
Montenegrin male swimmers
Yugoslav male swimmers
Olympic swimmers of Yugoslavia
Swimmers at the 1960 Summer Olympics
Sportspeople from Cetinje